"Adam's Song" is a song recorded by the American rock band Blink-182 for their third studio album, Enema of the State (1999). It was released as the third and final single from Enema of the State on March 14, 2000, through MCA Records. "Adam's Song" shares writing credits between the band's guitarist Tom DeLonge and bassist Mark Hoppus, but Hoppus was the primary composer of the song. The track concerns suicide, depression and loneliness. It incorporates a piano in its bridge section and was regarded as one of the most serious songs the band had written to that point.

Hoppus was inspired by the loneliness he experienced while on tour; while his bandmates had significant others to return home to, he was single. He was also influenced by a teen suicide letter he read in a magazine. The song takes the form of a suicide note, and contains lyrical allusions to the Nirvana song "Come as You Are". "Adam's Song" was one of the last songs to be written and recorded for Enema of the State, and it was nearly left off the album. Though Hoppus worried the subject matter was too depressing, his bandmates were receptive to its message. The song was produced by Jerry Finn.

"Adam's Song" peaked at number two on the US Billboard Hot Modern Rock Tracks chart; it was also a top 25 hit in Canada and Italy, but did not replicate its success on other charts. It received praise from music critics, who considered it a change of pace from the trio's more lighthearted singles. The single's music video, a hit on MTV, was directed by Liz Friedlander. Though the song was intended to inspire hope to those struggling with depression, it encountered controversy when a student of Columbine High School died by suicide with the track playing on repeat in 2000.

Background

Beginning in the summer of 1997, Blink-182 would enter an extended period of touring to support their second studio album, Dude Ranch. The group had played a handful of dates on the Vans Warped Tour 1996, a lifestyle tour promoting skateboarding and punk rock music. However, upon Dude Ranch release and popularity, Blink-182 would play every date of the 1997 tour worldwide with the bands NOFX and Social Distortion. The group were gone from their hometown of San Diego for nearly nine months straight beginning in late 1997. "When we did our longest tour stretch, it was right when I started dating my fiancee," recalled vocalist/guitarist Tom DeLonge. "We were all new and in love, and I had to leave. It was just, "Hey, I'll see you in nine months." It was really hard."

Bassist Mark Hoppus penned "Adam's Song" to vent these frustrations and the loneliness he experienced on the tour; while the other members had longtime girlfriends to return home to, Hoppus was single. "When you're on tour, you're so lonely," Hoppus said. "You hang out with all your bros and it's a great time and everything, but everybody wants to come home and have a girlfriend. And every time we'd fly home, Tom and [former drummer] Scott [Raynor] always had girlfriends waiting for them at the airport, and I didn't. It's about me being depressed and lonely out on tour, and not really having anything to come home to." The couplet "I couldn't wait til I got home/To pass the time in my room alone" originally ended "to get off the plane alone." In opposition to what Hoppus was feeling was the fact that the band were reaching professional highs: Dude Ranch had gone gold and the band were on the verge of stardom. "It feels ridiculous saying, 'Our band's doing really good, but personally, I'm not feeling like I'm connecting.' It felt like I had too much good fortune to complain about anything," he recalled in a later interview.

Hoppus said the song's inspiration came from "reading a magazine where some teenage kid had killed himself and left a letter for his family." Online rumors purported that the song was inspired by a friend from Hoppus' high school years who committed suicide, or a play titled Adam's Letter (2005) that has the same focus, but was not written until years after the song's release. John Cosper, the writer behind Adam's Letter, said, "the naming of the central character was a coincidence. The name goes back to the original script; I had no knowledge of Blink-182 or their music at that time."
In his memoir Can I Say, drummer Travis Barker wrote that the song's title was taken from a "sketch on Mr. Show about a band [Titannica] that writes a song with that name encouraging one particular fan to kill himself." David Cross, co-creator of Mr. Show, confirmed this, commenting, "They were fans of the show and that was a knowing tribute that I thought was pretty cool."

Recording and production
"Adam's Song" was among the last tracks composed and recorded for Enema of the State, and was nearly absent from the final album. The band was halfway finished with recording when Hoppus developed the idea. Though he worried it was "a bit too far and depressing for what we were trying to do," his bandmates were receptive towards the idea:

Although vocals would usually take many alternate takes to complete, Hoppus completed much of the vocal track for "Adam's Song" in a single take. "It's in a pretty high register for me, so I just blasted it out one night after dinner. That's, like, 90 percent of what's on the final track," he told Kerrang!. The idea to include piano in the track came without much forethought; "We realized, 'Well, this part here could sound rad if we put piano in here.' So we tried it out, and it sounded rad," said Hoppus. The piano was performed by session musician Roger Joseph Manning, Jr., best known for his work with Beck.

Composition

"Adam's Song" was a departure from the content of the band's previous singles, in favor of a slower tempo and more depressing lyrics. Brian Wallace of MTV wrote that Blink-182 "explores new ground on "Adam's Song," setting aside their normal pop-punk punch for a more emo-influenced approach." The song is a pop punk, emo, and alternative rock track composed in the key of C major and is set in time signature of common time with a tempo of 136 beats per minute. Hoppus' vocal range spans from G3 to G4.

The song begins with the narrator contemplating suicide with the lyrics "I never thought I'd die alone." The lyrics continue: "I'm too depressed to go on / You'll be sorry when I'm gone." "Adam's Song" includes a reference to "Come as You Are" by Nirvana. "Come as You Are" by Nirvana includes the lyrics "Take your time, hurry up, the choice is yours, don't be late". "Adam's Song", in turn, includes the lyrics "I took my time, I hurried up, The choice was mine, I didn't think enough".

Barker's drum track was labeled by Drummerworld as "one of the most creative beats of his career," and mainly consists of the same basic beat repeated in sections throughout the verses. The first measure begins with the kick drum and splash cymbal playing on the downbeat, followed by a hit on the bell of the ride cymbal on the "and" of beat two, preceding an open hi-hat that rings out for a full count on beat three. "The kick, snare, and floor tom are all hit simultaneously on beat four, followed by floor tom hits on the last two sixteenth-note triplets of beat four." The snare is hit on beats two and four, respectively. The song "gradually builds to a powerful, piano-laden crescendo," and the song's final chorus and conclusion take a more uplifting view of the world: "Tomorrow holds such better days / Days when I can still feel alive/ When I can't wait to get outside." DeLonge noted that over six guitar parts were recorded for the "gigantic, sad" choruses, but upon mixing, only four were used. "The extra ones didn't really do anything besides make it a little more unclear what was going on."

Commercial performance
"Adam's Song" was mainly a commercial success in the United States, but it was a top 25 hit in Canada and Italy as well. In the US, it debuted on Billboard Modern Rock Tracks chart at number 38 in the issue dated March 18, 2000. Over the following weeks, it gradually ascended the chart to a peak of number two in the issue dated April 29. It remained at that position for seven weeks, held off the top position by "Otherside" by the Red Hot Chili Peppers, and "Kryptonite" by 3 Doors Down. On May 13, the single peaked at number one on the Bubbling Under the Hot 100 chart. In CMJ New Music Report, a trade magazine that contained exclusive charts of non-commercial and college radio airplay and independent and trend-forward retail sales, "Adam's Song" was a number one hit on their Commercial Alternative Cuts chart in the issue dated May 15, 2000. The song made its sole appearance on Billboard Hot 100 Airplay chart on that same date, peaking at number 79. The song's last appearance on the Modern Rock Tracks chart came on September 9, 2000; as a whole, it spent 26 weeks on the chart. In the Billboard issue for July 19, 2003, Nielsen Broadcast Data Systems recognized the single with the BDS Certified Award for 100,000 radio spins. The song later made an appearance on Billboard Rock Digital Songs at position 38 shortly after the release of the band's sixth album, Neighborhoods, in October 2011.

In Canada, the single debuted on the Rock Report chart, compiled by RPM, on May 15, 2000, at number 26. Over the ensuing weeks, its position fluctuated, but it reached a peak of number 20 on June 12, 2000. It last appeared on the chart on July 24 at number 29 before dropping out. In Italy, the single reached a peak of number 21 and spent three weeks on the charts. In New Zealand, the song reached a peak of number 39 and spent six weeks on the chart, while in Germany, the single fared poorly, spending only one week and reaching a peak of 98. Although the song did not chart in the United Kingdom, the British Phonographic Industry (BPI) awarded the song a silver certification in October 2021 for sales and streams of over 200,000 units.

Critical reception
"Adam's Song" is generally considered one of the band's more serious songs, one "that hints at the emotional maturity they'd show on later releases," particularly their eponymous 2003 release. Richard Harrington of The Washington Post deemed the song "a powerful exploration of exhaustion and depression." Alex Pappademas, writing for Spin, compared the song to the music of Weezer. Katy Kroll of Billboard recognized it among her top 10 singles of 2000, calling it "a good old-fashioned depressing song with mainstream flair." Geoff Boucher, writing for the Los Angeles Times, called it "a poignant essay on a teen mulling over suicide"; conversely, Steve Appleford of the Los Angeles Times dubbed it a "moving if unremarkable examination." Scott Mervis of the Pittsburgh Post-Gazette called it a "rare departure from the usual Blink fare."

Writers for The A.V. Club listed it among other suicide-related songs in 2009, describing it as "surprisingly affecting, especially when the band reaches the bombastic chorus, and when the song describes suicide's crushing aftermath." In a retrospective review, Chris Payne of Billboard wrote, "Stylistically, it's also a Blink breakthrough: rather than putting their heads down and plowing through at breakneck speed, the band dials back the verses and interludes to let them breathe a bit. The resulting chorus achieves an arena-worthy feel not achieved anywhere else on Enema of the State."

In 2016, Stereogum ranked the song number two on their list of the 10 greatest Blink-182 songs, and in 2022, Kerrang ranked the song number five on their list of the 20 greatest Blink-182 songs.

Suicide of Greg Barnes
The song caused a controversy in 2000 when it was set to replay indefinitely on a nearby stereo as 17-year-old Greg Barnes, a teenager who attended Columbine High School and had lost one of his best friends in the massacre the previous year, hanged himself in the garage of his family's home. Both Hoppus and DeLonge were sympathetic but stressed the song's meaning during an MTV News interview in 2001:

Hoppus also told interviewers that he received fan mail following the song's release from fans that had contemplated suicide, but decided not to go through with it after hearing the song. Rolling Stone compared the controversy to that of Ozzy Osbourne's "Suicide Solution", which was played before a teen committed suicide in January 1986.

Music video
The song's music video was directed by Liz Friedlander and debuted on MTV's Total Request Live on March 7, 2000. It consists of performance footage of the trio in a warehouse in front of a wall decorated with photographs. In between verses, the photos' origins are explored through the different perspectives of individuals near the band. As the band prepares to play a show, a man has a conversation with a girl and is subsequently left alone. In another, while DeLonge and Hoppus read magazines inside a late-night convenience store, a melancholy woman attempts to make a call via a pay phone. Other montages show the trio in the company of friends and practicing, a man looking out upon the sea, and a solitary man deserted by others at an outdoor restaurant. The final montage consists of personal photos from the band's past. Friedlander's vision for the video was to focus on everyday individuals, going through difficult moments in their lives. "We never know what's going on in other people's lives," she told Andrew Limbong of NPR in 2018. "We all are dealing with our stuff, and we don't look, and don't see, and so then we don't notice."

Legacy
The band retired the song in 2009 after the death of Adam Goldstein, best known as DJ AM, a close personal friend of Barker and of the band. Hoppus noted that he could not bring himself to perform the tune, believing it to be "too hard". However, the band brought the song back after nine years, playing it again during their Kings of the Weekend Las Vegas residency in 2018. When asked about its revival, Hoppus said he found new meaning in the song: "I think of it more, now, as almost a celebration, of hardships gone through and friends lost."

For a 2018 broadcast of NPR's All Things Considered, reporter Andrew Limbong chose "Adam's Song" as part of their series of "American Anthems"—"music that challenges, unites, and celebrates". In describing his selection, he wrote:

Formats and track listing
All songs written by Mark Hoppus and Tom DeLonge, except where noted. Live tracks recorded in November 1999 at the Universal Amphitheatre, Los Angeles, California.

US/UK CD single (155 742-2)
"Adam's Song" (Radio Edit) – 3:35
"Going Away to College" (Live) – 3:46
"Adam's Song" (Live) – 4:53
"Adam's Song" (Video) – 4:09

German CD single (155 743-2)
"Adam's Song" (Radio Edit) – 3:35
"Going Away to College" (Live) – 3:46

Australian CD single (155 752-2)
"Adam's Song" (Radio Edit) – 3:35
"Going Away to College" (Live) – 3:46
"Adam's Song" (Live) – 4:53
"Wendy Clear" (Live) – 2:46

Credits and personnel 
Credits adapted from the liner notes for Enema of the State.

Locations
Recorded at Signature Sound and Studio West in San Diego, California, Mad Hatter Studios and the Bomb Factory in Los Angeles, California, Conway Recording Studios in Hollywood, California, and Big Fish Studios in Encinitas, California.
Mixed at Conway Recording Studios in Hollywood, California, and South Beach Studios in Miami, Florida.
Mastering at Bernie Grundman Mastering in Hollywood, California.

Personnel

Mark Hoppus – bass guitar, vocals
Tom DeLonge – guitars
Travis Barker – drums, percussion
Roger Joseph Manning, Jr. – piano
Jerry Finn – production
Tom Lord-Alge – mixing engineer
Sean O'Dwyer – recording engineer

Darrel Harvey – assistant engineer
John Nelson – assistant engineer
Robert Read – assistant engineer
Mike Fasano – drum technician
Rick DeVoe – management
Gary Ashley – A&R
Brian Gardner – mastering engineer

Charts

Weekly charts

Year-end charts

Certifications

References

Citations

Bibliography

External links
 

1999 songs
2000 singles
Emo songs
Blink-182 songs
Rock ballads
Songs about loneliness
Songs about suicide
Songs about depression
Songs written by Mark Hoppus
Music videos directed by Liz Friedlander
Music controversies
2000 controversies in the United States
Songs written by Tom DeLonge